The Bomber Restaurant operated in Milwaukie, Oregon for 73 years.

In 1947, Art Lacey purchased a B-17 bomber for $13,000 and flew it from Oklahoma to Troutdale. He then disassembled it, transported it covertly, and placed it atop his 48-pump gas station. Lacey also opened the Bomber Restaurant and motel. The gas station was closed in 1991; Lacey died in 2000. The cockpit was removed for restoration, probably in the 2000s. The entire B-17 was disassembled and removed in 2014 for restoration.

The site was listed in Chuck Palahniuk's book Fugitives and Refugees (2003).

References

External links
 Google streetview showing plane minus cockpit section in 2009

2020 disestablishments in Oregon
Milwaukie, Oregon
Restaurants disestablished in 2020
Restaurants established in the 20th century
Restaurants in Oregon
Defunct restaurants in Oregon